Xylø (stylised in all caps) is the alias of American singer-songwriter Paige Duddy. From 2015 to 2018, Xylø was a musical duo that consisted of Duddy and her brother Chase. Since 2018, Duddy has embarked on a solo career and has continued to release her new music under the Xylø moniker.

As a duo, Xylø was best known for the debut single, "America", which was self-released in February 2015 and saw commercial success online through digital outlets such as NoiseTrade. The single's success resulted in Xylø securing a record deal with Sony Music Entertainment.

Following the departure of Chase in 2018, Paige continued to release new music under the moniker. The releases included four EPs: Pretty Sad, Yes and No, The Ganglands of My Heart and Outsiders Club. All were released under independent label Pretty Records. The title track from Yes & No is her most successful song on Spotify to date, garnering almost 30 million streams as of December 2021.

Background
Paige Duddy is the granddaughter of late jazz drummer Joe Porcaro, and niece of three members of Toto.

Duddy is a supporter of the English football team Queens Park Rangers.

Career

2015-2017: America EP and singles

In February 2015, XYLØ released their debut single, "America", which received attention on YouTube. The self-released song was promoted through Hype Machine and NoiseTrade. The song eventually made it onto the top 10 of the Hype Machine chart and was debuted on American radio through KCRW.

On June 4, XYLØ released their second song, "Between the Devil and the Deep Blue Sea". Through Apple Music, the duo released their third song, "Afterlife", on July 22, 2015. In September 2015, they were featured as special guests on Oh Wonder's live show in Los Angeles. Their fourth song, entitled "L.A. Love Song", was released on October 7, 2015. The following month, the group announced they were taking a break to focus on producing more material. Shortly afterward, they announced as signees to Sony Music Entertainment.

In 2016, the duo had embarked on a number of their own live shows and released their debut EP, America. On February 19, 2016, they announced their fifth single "Bang Bang", released through Apple Music. Two days before the extended play's release, they announced their sixth and final single to be released through the EP, entitled "BLK CLD", released February 26, 2016. The EP was released on February 27, 2016, through Sony Music Entertainment. During the release, the duo launched their official VEVO channel on YouTube with the music video for their debut single "America", which sparked the single's official release, to celebrate a year since its original release. On June 10, 2016, they released the America (The Remixes) EP, which includes remixes from Young Bombs and Win & Woo. The group was slated to headline a North American tour with 26 dates across the US and Canada, but the tour was cancelled on August 29, 2017, "due to unforeseen circumstances".

The duo released a new single "Fool's Paradise" on August 5, 2016. The duo was featured on "Setting Fires" by the Chainsmokers, released as part of the Collage EP on November 4, 2016. "Gossip" was released on September 7, 2016. The instrumental of the song was used by Apple in their commercial for the Apple Keynote. They went on to release two more singles, "Dead End Love" and "Get Closer" before 2017 ended. Both of which gained accompanying music videos.

In 2017, they released the single "I Still Wait For You" which become arguably their most successful single to date. They also released the singles "Alive" and "What We're Looking For" as a two-part series in music video form.

2018–2020: Chase's departure and multiple EPs
On June 1, 2018 "Heaven Only Knows" was released. Paige announced via Twitter that Chase had left the group to focus on other projects, leaving her as the sole member. "Don't Panic" was released on June 29, 2018, and "I Don't Want To See You Anymore" was released on August 3, 2018. Xylø went on to release "Tears & Tantrums" and "Freak" later in the year, both of which had music videos. Sometime at the end of 2018, Paige cut ties with Disruptor Records, and started releasing her music under the independent label Pretty Records.

On February 12, 2019, it was announced that an EP titled Pretty Sad would be released March 1, 2019. The lead single "Nothing Left To Say" was released two days later. It was announced via social media on May 3, 2019, that Xylø's new EP, Yes & No, would be released on May 31, 2019, with the lead single "Ride or Die" being released on May 17. On May 21, 2019, a second single "The End" was announced to be released on May 24, 2019. In June 2019, Xylø announced she would be embarking on the Yes & No Tour, which concluded in September 2019. She released her fourth EP, The Ganglands of My Heart on February 14, 2020, which was preceded by the singles "Tongue in the Bag" and "American Sadness".

On March 27, 2020, a compilation album including all the instrumentals from her three previous releases was released.

Later that year, Xylø released her fifth EP, Outsiders Club, for which she launched an official website for. The EP was released on November 20, 2020, with "Apple Pie", "Chlorine", and "Lefty" being released as singles prior to the EP's release. Music videos were also released for the latter two singles.

2021–present: Unamerican Beauty
During 2021, Xylø teased via social media that her debut album was in the works. On December 13, Xylø posted on various social medias a photo of her and the phone number "(310)-564-7089". By calling the number, Xylø reads the listener a monologue. Two days later, Xylø uploaded an official trailer for the album, revealing the album's title to be Unamerican Beauty and that it would be released in 2022. Xylø then also announced via Twitter that the album's first single would be released in January.

Discography

Studio albums

Extended plays

Compilation albums

Singles

As lead artist

As a featured artist

Songwriting and production credits

References

External links
 Official Website

American indie pop musicians
Dream pop musical groups
American electronic music groups
Columbia Records artists